is an ongoing original Japanese anime television series created by Tsutomu Nihei and animated by Polygon Pictures to commemorate the studio's 40th anniversary. The series premiered in January 2023 on Fuji TV's +Ultra programming block. A manga adaptation with art by Itoe Takemoto began serialization in Kodansha's shōnen manga magazine Monthly Shōnen Sirius in February 2022. Crunchyroll holds the license of both the manga and the anime.

Plot
Kaina lives on a world covered in an organic membrane called the Canopy, created by massive Orbital Spire Trees. Far beneath the Canopy at the foot of the Orbital Spire Trees lies the endless Snow Sea, where Princess Ririha and her country of Atland struggle to survive against the cold and the rival nation of Valghan. When Ririha travels to the Canopy in a desperate bid to save her country, she is rescued by Kaina, setting in motion events that will have the pair travel the world to uncover its secrets.

Characters

Media

Manga
A manga adaptation illustrated by Itoe Takemoto began serialization in Kodansha's shōnen manga magazine Monthly Shōnen Sirius on February 26, 2022. The first tankōbon volume was released on December 8, 2022. Crunchyroll is publishing the manga in English and worldwide.

Anime
The original anime television series created by Tsutomu Nihei and animated by Polygon Pictures to commemorate the studio's 40th anniversary was announced on January 20, 2022. The series is directed by Hiroaki Ando, written by Sadayuki Murai and Tetsuya Yamada, with main theme by Hiroyuki Sawano, and music by Kohta Yamamoto and Misaki Umase. It premiered on January 12, 2023, on Fuji TV's +Ultra programming block. The first four episodes were previously screened at Crunchyroll Expo 2022.  Yorushika performed the opening theme song , while Greeeen performed the ending theme song . Crunchyroll streams the series worldwide. Medialink licensed the series in Asia-Pacific and streams on Ani-One Asia YouTube channel.

Notes

References

External links
 Manga official website 
 Anime official website 
 

+Ultra
2023 anime television series debuts
Anime with original screenplays
Bandai Namco franchises
Crunchyroll anime
Crunchyroll manga
High fantasy anime and manga
Kodansha manga
Medialink
Polygon Pictures
Shōnen manga
Tsutomu Nihei
Television series set on fictional planets